Riovic Capital Group, or simply Riovic, is a financial technology company and private equity holding company that provides a platform that lets private companies discover private equity funds, raise capital, manage their capitalization tables and manage shareholder and investor relations.

The company entered the market as an insurance technology platform that connected private investors with insurance seekers, allowing the investors to backstop claims in exchange for premiums, but expanded to other areas in financial technology.

In September 2015 the company officially launched a money transfer service called RiovicPay to help people access cross-border money remittance services on holidays and after hours. The service was rebranded to AfricanRemit. It then released its on-demand platform for financial services, labeled the Uber of Finance, in November 2015. The platform provided financial advisers, crowd investing and Peer-to-peer insurance.

In 2016 the company was labelled the Lloyd's of FinTech and successfully launched this revised model to eliminate insurance companies in the insurance value by directly connecting brokers and consumers with risk capital. Also labelled the "Uber of Insurance", Riovic pioneered "private investor backed insurance" where a private investor (or group of private investors) essentially steps into the financial shoes of the insurer, accepting a stream of certain cash flows in exchange for an uncertain future liability. Riovic acquired a minority stake in New Zealand's PeerCover in February 2016.

Riovic was admitted into RMIH Alphacode, an incubator for next generation financial services companies (similar to Level39) in 2015. It was also part of the first batches of Facebook FBStart, Microsoft for Startups, IBM Global Entrepreneurs and Google Launchpad.

In April 2016, it got nominated as the only insurtech company in the African FinTech Awards and also go listed on the African FinTech 100 list.

See also 
 Phiwa Nkambule
 Cybatar

References

External links 

 
 
 
 

Financial technology companies
Technology companies of Africa
Companies based in Johannesburg
Financial services companies of South Africa
Information technology companies of South Africa
Financial services companies established in 2015
Technology companies established in 2015
Peer-to-peer
South African brands
Hedge funds
Investment funds
Funds
Institutional investors
Investment companies
Investment banks
Private equity firms
Private equity companies of South Africa
Venture capital firms
Alternative investment management companies